Alagoinhas Atlético Clube, commonly referred to as Atlético de Alagoinhas, is a Brazilian football club based in Alagoinhas, Bahia. The club plays in Série D, the fourth tier of Brazilian football, as well as in the Campeonato Baiano, the top level of the Bahia state football league. They won this league in 2022.

They competed in the 1972 Campeonato Brasileiro Série B, in the 2004 Série C and in the 2009 Série D.

History
Alagoinhas Atlético Clube were founded on 2 April 1970, by a group of sportsmen. Their first official game was a 2–0 win against Leônico, played a year later. Atlético reached the semifinal level in the Série B in 1972, and were eliminated in the first stage in the Série C in 2004, and in the Série D in 2009.

Stadium
Atlético de Alagoinhas play their home games at Carneirão. The stadium has a maximum capacity of 18,000 people.

League and cup history
Série D: 37th – relegated
 4th – eliminated at the first stage
2010: 6th (state), 2nd (state cup)
2011: 11th (state), 2nd (state cup)
2012: 6th (state), 3rd (state cup)
2013: 12th – relegated

Honours 
Campeonato Baiano: 2021, 2022
Campeonato Baiano Segunda Divisão: 2018

Statistics
Best position: Semifinal Stage of Série B: 3rd place

Current squad
2016 season

CBF ranking
Position: 148th
Points: 32

Former managers
 Antônio Dumas (2007–2008)

References

Association football clubs established in 1970
Football clubs in Bahia
1970 establishments in Brazil